All Saints’ Church, Ripley is a Grade II listed parish church in the Church of England in Ripley, Derbyshire.

History
The church dates from 1821. It was built by the Butterley Company. The baptistry was added in 1921 and it was restored in 1951.

Organ
The church contains an organ by Robert Postill of York dating from 1846. A specification of the organ can be found on the National Pipe Organ Register.

Organists
Leslie B. Taylor 
Fred Morley 1927 - 1933 (formerly organist of St Luke's Church, Derby and afterwards organist of St Andrew's Church, Derby)
Cyril M. Arthur 1933 - ????

See also
Listed buildings in Ripley, Derbyshire

References

Church of England church buildings in Derbyshire
Grade II listed churches in Derbyshire
Churches completed in 1821